The 2009 NCAA Division I Cross Country Championships were the 71st annual NCAA Men's Division I Cross Country Championship and the 29th annual NCAA Women's Division I Cross Country Championship to determine the team and individual national champions of NCAA Division I men's and women's collegiate cross country running in the United States. In all, four different titles were contested: men's and women's individual and team championships.

Held on November 23, 2009, the combined meet was the sixth of eight consecutive meets hosted by Indiana State University at the LaVern Gibson Championship Cross Country Course in Terre Haute, Indiana.  The distance for the men's race was 10 kilometers (6.21 miles) while the distance for the women's race was 6 kilometers (3.73 miles). 

The men's team championship was won by Oklahoma State (127 points), the Cowboys' second overall and first since 1954. The women's team championship was won by Villanova (79 points), the Wildcats' eighth overall and first since 1998.

The two individual champions were, for the men, Samuel Chelanga (Liberty, 28:41.3) and, for the women, Angela Bizzarri (Illinois, 19:46.8).

Men's title
Distance: 10,000 meters

Men's Team Result (Top 10)

Men's Individual Result (Top 10)

Women's title
Distance: 6,000 meters

Women's Team Result (Top 10)

Women's Individual Result (Top 10)

References
 

NCAA Cross Country Championships
NCAA Division I Cross Country Championships
NCAA Division I Cross Country Championships
NCAA Division I Cross Country Championships
Track and field in Indiana
Terre Haute, Indiana
Indiana State University